Delmenhorst – Wesermarsch – Oldenburg-Land is an electoral constituency (German: Wahlkreis) represented in the Bundestag. It elects one member via first-past-the-post voting. Under the current constituency numbering system, it is designated as constituency 28. It is located in northwestern Lower Saxony, comprising the city of Delmenhorst and the districts of Wesermarsch and Landkreis Oldenburg.

Delmenhorst – Wesermarsch – Oldenburg-Land was created for the inaugural 1949 federal election. Since 2021, it has been represented by Susanne Mittag of the Social Democratic Party (SPD).

Geography
Delmenhorst – Wesermarsch – Oldenburg-Land is located in northwestern Lower Saxony. As of the 2021 federal election, it comprises the independent city of Delmenhorst and the entirety of the districts of Wesermarsch and Landkreis Oldenburg.

History
Delmenhorst – Wesermarsch – Oldenburg-Land was created in 1949. In the 1949 election, it was Lower Saxony constituency 7. For the 1953 through 1961 elections, it was constituency 29 in the numbering system. From 1965 through 1998, it was constituency 23; from 2002 through 2009, it was constituency 29. Since the 2013 election, it has been constituency 28.

Originally, it comprised the city of Oldenburg, the district of Wesermarsch, and the municipalities of Dötlingen, Ganderkesee, Hasbergen, Hude, Schönemoor, Stuhr and Wildeshausen from Landkreis Oldenburg. At this time, it was named Delmenhorst – Wesermarsch. Due to administrative reforms, in the 1976 election, it gained the former municipality of Wüsting. In the 1980 election, the constituency gained the entirety of Landkreis Oldenburg. In the 1987 election, it was renamed to Delmenhorst – Wesermarsch – Oldenburg-Land.

Members
The constituency was held by the Social Democratic Party (SPD) from its creation in 1949 until 1953, during which time it was represented by Fritz Ohlig. It was won by the Christian Democratic Union (CDU) in 1957, and represented by Hermann Ehlers (until 1957) and then J. Hermann Siemer. In 1961, it was won by the SPD candidate Heinrich Müller, who served for one term. Siemer won the constituency back for the CDU in the following election, but Müller returned again in 1969 and served three terms. He was succeeded in 1980 by fellow SPD candidate Margitta Terborg, who served until 1998. Holger Ortel then held the constituency for the SPD until 2009. CDU candidate Astrid Grotelüschen won in 2009, and was re-elected in 2013 and 2017. Susanne Mittag regained it for the SPD in 2021.

Election results

2021 election

2017 election

2013 election

2009 election

References

Federal electoral districts in Lower Saxony
Oldenburg Land
1949 establishments in West Germany
Constituencies established in 1949